Marinomonas hwangdonensis is a Gram-negative, rod-shaped and motile bacterium from the genus of Marinomonas which has been isolated from seawater from the Yellow Sea on Korea.

References

External links
Type strain of Marinomonas hwangdonensis at BacDive -  the Bacterial Diversity Metadatabase

Oceanospirillales
Bacteria described in 2012